Anne-Sophie Mondière (born 1 February 1979 in Roanne, Loire) is a French judoka.

External links
 
 

1979 births
Living people
Sportspeople from Roanne
French female judoka
Judoka at the 2008 Summer Olympics
Judoka at the 2012 Summer Olympics
Olympic judoka of France
Universiade medalists in judo
Universiade bronze medalists for France
21st-century French women
20th-century French women
Medalists at the 2001 Summer Universiade